Kim Hyeon-dong (born October 3, 1970), better known as his stage name Kim Gu-ra is a South Korean MC, comedian and radio host.

Career
He first appeared on television in the 1990s in comedy shows and comedy skits. Kim was blasted by the Korean public for harshly criticizing boy band H.O.T. member Moon Hee Jun of his musical style, fashion, and hairstyle on his radio show, yet he was paired with Moon when hosting shows. He was also well known for being one of the main MCs of popular Korean variety show Line Up. He was also one of the main MC'S of popular South Korean shows Quiz that Changes the World, Radio Star and The Moments of Truth Korea. He is well known for his blunt yet humorous attitude when hosting TV shows. He has also appeared as a guest on A Table for the Gods.

His son, Kim Dong-hyeon, also appeared on television in Bungeoppang and other shows as well, most notably Star Golden Bell and also in the MBC drama 'May Queen' as the younger version of the main female character's older (step) brother.

In April 2012, Kim quit the eight entertainment programmes he hosts, following controversy over a 2002 audio clip from a radio programme, where he likened comfort women to prostitutes.

He is set to return to television in January 2013, hosting new variety show Men's Stuff with Lee Sang-min on cable channel JTBC.

Filmography
2015 Home Food Rescue

Variety shows 
 Radio Star
 Trio’s Childcare Challenge
 Those Who Cross the Line (Season 1)
2021 : Leader's Love  Host
 Time Out (2021 - Host)
 God and the Battle ( 2022)
 Back to the Ground (2022) 
 Gura Kim's Latte 9 (2022, Host)
The Hall of Yesul (2022)
 Four Like (2022) - Host
 Because It's My First New House (2022); Host
 Truth World (2023); Host
 One Meal After Work (2023); Host

Web shows 
 Between Marriage and Divorce (2022, Host)

Films

Awards and nominations

Listicles

References

External links

 Kim Gu-ra profile on hancinema

South Korean television presenters
South Korean radio presenters
South Korean comedians
Inha University alumni
People from Incheon
1970 births
Living people
Andong Kim clan
Radio controversies
Best Variety Performer Male Paeksang Arts Award (television) winners